The Battle of the Eastern Solomons was fought August 23–25, 1942 in the waters east and northeast of the Solomon Islands by forces of the Imperial Japanese Navy's Combined Fleet and the US Navy's Pacific Fleet. The battle resulted from a major effort by the Japanese to reinforce their troop strength on the island of Guadalcanal. The Japanese high command had realized this reinforcement was necessary following the annihilation of the Ichiki Detachment by the 1st Marines a few days earlier.

The battle can be counted both a tactical and strategic American victory: greater ship losses were inflicted on the Japanese, and the transports were turned back from their mission of landing reinforcements.

Forces deployed
 Japanese forces
 Combat ships: 2 fleet carriers, 1 light carrier, 3 old battleships, 13 heavy cruisers, 3 light cruisers, 30 destroyers, 2 1st-class submarines, 1 2nd-class submarine
 Aircraft: 69 fighters, 41 dive bombers, 57 torpedo bombers

 American forces 
 Combat ships: 3 fleet carriers, 1 fast battleship, 5 heavy cruisers, 2 anti-aircraft light cruisers, 18 destroyers
 Aircraft: 100 fighters, 54 dive bombers, 54 scout bombers, 45 torpedo bombers

Ship losses
 IJN : 1 light carrier, 1 destroyer, 1 1st-class submarine
 USN : none

Japanese order of battle

Guadalcanal Supporting Forces 
Vice Admiral Nobutake Kondo in heavy cruiser Atago

 Advanced Force
 Vice Admiral Kondo

 Main Body
 Cruiser Division 4
 Cruiser Division 5 (Vice Adm. Takeo Takagi)
 2  heavy cruisers (10 × 8-in. main battery): , 
 Destroyer Squadron 4 (Rear Adm. Tamotsu Takama):
 1  light cruiser (7 × 5.5-in. main battery): 
 2  destroyers (6 × 5-in. main battery): , 

 Support Group
 1  battleship (8 × 16-in. main battery): 

 Striking Force
 Vice Admiral Chuichi Nagumo in fleet carrier Shokaku

 Carrier Group
 Vice Admiral Nagumo
 2  fleet carriers
  (Capt. Masafumi Arima) 
 27 Mitsubishi A6M "Zeke" fighters (Lt. Hideki Shingo)
 27 Aichi D3A "Val" dive bombers (Lt. Cdr. Mamoru Seki)
 18 Nakajima B5N "Kate" torpedo bombers (Lt. Cdr. Shigeharu Murata)
  (Capt. Tameteru Notomo)
 27 Mitsubishi A6M "Zeke" fighters (Lt. Ayao Shirane)
 27 Aichi D3A "Val" dive bombers (Lt. Sadamu Takahashi)
 18 Nakajima B5N "Kate" torpedo bombers (Lt. Shigeichirō Imajuku)
 Screen
 1  (6 × 5-in. main battery): 
 2  (6 × 5-in. main battery): , 

  Vanguard Group 
 Rear Admiral Hiroaki Abe
 Battleships
 2  fast battleships (8 × 14-in. main battery): , 
 Cruiser Division 7 (Rear Adm. Shoji Nishimura)
 2  (10 × 8-in. main battery): , 
 1  (8 × 8-in. main battery): 
 Destroyer Squadron 10 (Rear Admiral Susumu Kimura)
 1  light cruiser (7 × 5.5-in. main battery): 
 1  destroyer (8 × 4-in. main battery): 

  Diversionary Group 
 Rear Admiral Chūichi Hara in heavy cruiser Tone
 1 light carrier: Ryujo (Capt. Tadao Katō) (sunk)
 24 Mitsubishi A6M "Zeke" fighters (Lt. Kenjirō Nōtomi)
 9 Nakajima B5N "Kate" torpedo bombers (Lt. Binichi Murakami)
 1  heavy cruiser (8 × 8-in. main battery): Tone
 2  destroyers (6 × 5-in. main battery): ,

Southeast Area Forces 

Vice Admiral Nishizo Tsukahara

 Outer South Seas Force
 Vice Admiral Gunichi Mikawa

 Reinforcement Group
 Rear Admiral Raizo Tanaka
 Transport Unit
 1 auxiliary cruiser: Kinryu Maru
 Embarking 800 men of the 5th Yokosuka SNLF
 4 patrol boats: #1, #2, #34, #35 
 Embarking 700 men of the 2nd echelon of the IJA Ichiki Detachment
 Escort Unit
 1  light cruiser (7 × 5.5-in. main battery, 1 scout plane): 
 2  destroyers (6 × 5-in. main battery): , 
 3  destroyers (4 × 4.7-in. main battery):  (sunk), 

 Covering Group
 Vice Admiral Mikawa
 1  heavy cruiser: 
 Cruiser Division 6 (Rear Adm. Aritomo Goto)
 2  heavy cruisers (6 × 8-in. main battery): , 
 1  heavy cruiser (6 × 8-in. main battery): 

 Submarine Group
 2 1st-class submarines: ,  (sunk)
 1 2nd-class submarine:

American order of battle

Task Force 61 
Vice Admiral Frank Jack Fletcher in Saratoga

Task Force 11 
Vice Admiral Fletcher

 1  fleet carrier
  (Capt. DeWitt C. Ramsey)
 Air Group (Cmdr. Harry D. Felt)
 VF-5: 27 F4F Wildcat fighters (Lt. Cmdr. Leroy C. Simpler)
 VB-3: 17 SBD Dauntless dive bombers (Lt. Cmdr. Dewitt W. Shumway)
 VS-3: 15 SBD Dauntless scout bombers (Lt. Cmdr. Louis J. Kirn)
 VT-8: 13 TBF Avenger torpedo bombers (Lt. Harold H. Larsen)
 Cruisers (Rear Adm. Carleton H. Wright)
 2  heavy cruisers (9 × 8-in./55-cal. main battery)
  (Capt. Frank J. Lowry)
  (Capt. Walter S. DeLany)
 Screen (Capt. Samuel B. Brewer)
 5 destroyers
 1  (8 × 5-in./38 SP/low elevation main battery): Phelps
 4  (5 × 5-in./38 SP/low elevation main battery): Farragut, MacDonough, Worden, Dale

Task Force 16 

Rear Admiral Thomas C. Kinkaid in Enterprise

 1  fleet carrier
  (Capt. Arthur C. Davis)
 Air Group (Lt. Cmdr. Maxwell F. Leslie)
 VF-6: 29 F4F Wildcat fighters (Lt. Louis H. Bauer)
 VB-6: 17 SBD Dauntless dive bombers (Lt. Ray Davis)
 VS-5: 18 SBD Dauntless scout bombers (Lt. Turner F. Caldwell)
 VT-3: 15 TBF Avenger torpedo bombers (Lt. Cmdr. Charles M. Jett)

 Battleship and Cruisers (Rear Adm. Mahlon S. Tisdale)
 1  fast battleship (9 × 16-in./45-cal. main battery)
  (Capt. George H. Fort)
 1  heavy cruiser (9 × 8-in./55-cal. main battery)
  (Capt. Laurance T. DuBose)
 1  anti-aircraft light cruiser (16 × 5-in./38-cal. main battery)
  (Capt. Samuel P. Jenkins)

 Screen (Capt. Edward P. Sauer)
 6 destroyers
 1  (8 × 5-in./38 SP/low elevation main battery): Balch
 2  (5 × 5-in. dual purpose main battery): Grayson, Monssen
 1  (4 × 5-in./38 SP/low elevation main battery): Maury
 2  (4 × 5-in./38 SP/low elevation main battery): Benham, Ellet

Task Force 18 (deployed but did not take part in battle) 

Rear Admiral Leigh Noyes in Wasp

 1 Wasp-class fleet carrier
 Wasp (Capt. Forrest P. Sherman)
 Air Group (Lt. Cmdr. Wallace M. Beakley)
 VF-71: 28 F4F Wildcat fighters (Lt. Cmdr. Courtney Shands)
 VS-71: 18 SBD Dauntless scout bombers (Lt. Cmdr. John Eldridge)
 VS-72: 18 SBD Dauntless scout bombers (Lt. Cmdr. Ernest M. Snowden)
 VT-7:   15 TBF Avenger torpedo bombers (Lt. Henry A. Romberg)

 Cruisers (Rear Adm. Norman Scott)
 1  heavy cruiser (10 × 8-in. main battery)
  (Capt. Charles H. McMorris)
 1  heavy cruiser (9 × 8-in. main battery)
  (Capt. Ernest G. Small)
 1  anti-aircraft light cruiser (16 × 5-in. main battery)              S
  (Capt. James E. Maher)

 Screen (Capt. Robert G. Tobin)
 7 destroyers
 1  (8 × 5-in. main battery): Selfridge 
 2  (5 × 5-in. main battery): Aaron Ward, Buchanan 
 3  (4 × 5-in. main battery): Lang, Stack, Sterett
 1  (4 × 5-in. main battery): Farenholt

Individual attack waves

Attack on Enterprise (Nagumo carrier group 1st wave) 
 10 Mitsubishi A6M "Zeke" fighters: 4 from Shokaku, 6 from Zuikaku
 27 Aichi D3A "Val" dive bombers: 18 from Shokaku, 9 from Zuikaku

Nagumo carrier group 2nd wave (found no targets) 
 9 Mitsubishi A6M "Zeke" fighters: 3 from Shokaku, 6 from Zuikaku
 27 Aichi D3A "Val" dive bombers:94 from Shokaku, 18 from Zuikaku

Ryūjō Attack on Henderson Field 
 6 Nakajima B5N "Kate" torpedo bombers: all from Ryūjō
 14 Mitsubishi A6M "Zeke" fighters: all from Ryūjō

B-17 strike on Nagumo carrier group 
 TBD

Saratoga strike on Ryūjō 
 TBD

B-17 strike on Ryūjō 
 TBD

Notes

References

Bibliography 
 
 
 

Conflicts in 1942
Pacific Ocean theatre of World War II
Naval aviation operations and battles
Guadalcanal Campaign
Naval battles of World War II involving Japan
Naval battles of World War II involving the United States
August 1942 events
World War II orders of battle
United States Navy in World War II